The What Now? Tour was a comedy tour by American comedian Kevin Hart. The tour began in San Antonio at the AT&T Center on April 9, 2015, and concluded on August 7, 2016, in Columbus at the Columbus Civic Center.

Background and development 
Billboard's Ray Waddel wrote on March 6, 2015, that the What Now? Tour was on track for the biggest comedy tour of all time. Hart toured a total of 168 shows across North America, Europe, Asia, Oceania, and Africa. Some cities like Buffalo, Orlando, and Jacksonville, Baltimore, Miami, and Tampa, Hart held two shows on the same day.

Tour dates

Box office score data

Feature film 
A film about the tour, entitled Kevin Hart: What Now?, was released on October 14, 2016.

Notes

References 

Comedy tours
Events at Malmö Arena